Mona Scott-Young ( Scott; born February 15, 1967) is an American television producer and entrepreneur. She is the CEO of the multi-media entertainment company Monami Productions, best known for producing the VH1 reality television franchise Love & Hip Hop.

Life and career

Scott was born and raised in New York City to Haitian parents. In 2005, she married Shawn Young. They have two children.

Violator
While working at Radio City Music Hall, Scott-Young was approached by the Brooklyn group TrackMasters to come on board as their manager. Through them, she met music executive Chris Lighty and, in 1996, the two co-founded the management company Violator. Over the course of twenty years, Violator helped launch and revamp the careers of artists such as Busta Rhymes, LL Cool J, Q-Tip, Foxy Brown, Ja Rule, Mobb Deep, 50 Cent, Mariah Carey, Fantasia and Missy Elliott, who she still manages today.

Television

Scott-Young transitioned into television in 2005, producing The Road to Stardom with Missy Elliott on UPN and creating her own television production company, Monami Productions. In 2006, Jim Ackerman, a director at VH1 at the time, approached her to help develop a reality television series which centered on rapper Jim Jones. Inspired by female ensemble-driven shows that were popular at the time, Scott-Young shifted the concept to focus on Jim's girlfriend Chrissy Lampkin and her circle of friends. The series, now known as Love & Hip Hop, went on to become a huge success,.

Scott-Young sees the Love & Hip Hop brand as an opportunity maker. "To have a franchise that represents our culture, our people and to have that kind of staying power and the ability to invent and reinvent as we expand into different cities to me that's probably what I'm proudest of. [It's] the ability to provide the jobs both in front of and behind the scenes... to women and people of color as well.".

The show spawned a media franchise that included the spin-offs Love & Hip Hop: Atlanta, Love & Hip Hop: Hollywood, Love & Hip Hop: Miami, Chrissy & Mr. Jones, K. Michelle: My Life, Stevie J & Joseline: Go Hollywood and Leave It to Stevie. In addition to the Love & Hip Hop franchise, Monami Productions has produced Donald Trump Presents: The Ultimate Merger for TV One, Cocaine: History Between the Lines for the History Channel, The Gossip Game and This Is Hot 97 for VH1, The New Atlanta for Bravo and Money. Power. Respect. for WE tv.

In addition to television, Scott-Young is part owner and chief marketing officer of the moscato brand MYX Fusions with rapper Nicki Minaj, and serves on the board of The Haitian Roundtable, The RSQ Foundation and The GrassROOTS Foundation.

Awards and accolades
Scott-Young has been honored at ASCAP's "Woman Behind the Music" event in 2011. She has been honored with awards from the National Association of Black Female Executives in Music Entertainment, named "Marketer of the Year" by Ad Age, and recognized by the National Congress and Convention of Haitian-Americans. Scott-Young was awarded at the MTV Movie & TV Awards for "Reality TV Royalty".

She received the Women's Entrepreneurship Day Organization’s Entertainment Pioneer Award at the United Nations in 2022, celebrating her as a trailblazer and innovator in her field. The prestigious award, also recognized by the US Congress, highlights women entrepreneurs and the meaningful impact they are having on the world.

Filmography

Film

Television

References

External links
 

1967 births
Living people
American women chief executives
American chief executives
American music industry executives
American people of Haitian descent
20th-century Haitian people
21st-century American women